"School" is a song co-written by Rick Davies and Roger Hodgson of British rock band Supertramp, and included in the band's third and breakthrough 1974 album, Crime of the Century, of which it was the opening track. It was later released as a single in 1983, backed with "Oh Darling", a track from their 1979 album Breakfast in America, and charted at number 27 in Netherlands in 1989. In 2020, the song peaked at number 1 as its highest radio airplay chart in Spain.

Song structure
The song starts with a long, slow harmonica intro. Hodgson’s verse vocals are first only above his flanged guitar, and then an elongated, strummed guitar section before the song finally fully kicks in. Davies later provides a bright piano lead. It has been described as presaging a similar approach used on Pink Floyd's "Another Brick in the Wall (Part Two)", a centrepiece of the band's 1979 similar concept album The Wall.

Live performances
"School" became a live staple for the band, and was used to open their concerts, as seen in the albums Paris and Is Everybody Listening?. It's the third most played live song by the band. After Roger Hodgson left the band in 1983, the song entered in his repertoire, and he performed it on all of his solo tours.

Reception
"School" was well-received, despite not being one of their biggest charting hits. Besides its appearance on many live and compilation albums, Ultimate Classic Rock ranks the song 3rd among the band's top 10 songs, and Hodgson himself considers it as one of his best songs. He stated the song is "basically saying that what they teach us in schools is all very fine, but it’s what they don’t teach us in schools that creates so much confusion in our being. They don’t really prepare us for life in terms of teaching us who we are on the inside. They teach us how to function on the outside and to be very intellectual, but they don’t tell us how to act with our intuition or our heart or really give us a real plausible explanation of what life’s about."

Other releases
Paris
The Very Best of Supertramp
It Was the Best of Times
Is Everybody Listening?
Retrospectacle – The Supertramp Anthology (Both single and double-disc editions)
70-10 Tour

Charts
 Netherlands: number 27 (14 weeks) – 1989
 Spain: number 1 – 2020

References

1974 songs
Supertramp songs
Songs written by Rick Davies
Songs written by Roger Hodgson
Song recordings produced by Ken Scott